The contract bridge mixed team competition at the 2018 Asian Games was held at the Jakarta International Expo, Jakarta, Indonesia from 21 to 27 August 2018.

Schedule 
All times are Western Indonesia Time (UTC+07:00)

Squads

Results

Qualification round

Knockout round

Semifinals

Final

References 

Results

External links
Results

Bridge at the 2018 Asian Games